Greetings from Asbury Park, N.J. is the debut studio album by American singer-songwriter Bruce Springsteen. It was produced by Mike Appel and Jim Cretecos from June through October 1972 at the budget-priced 914 Sound Studios. The album was released January 5, 1973, by Columbia Records to average sales but positive critical reviews.

Greetings from Asbury Park, N.J. first charted in the United Kingdom on June 15, 1985, in the wake of Springsteen's Born in the U.S.A. tour arriving in Britain; it remained in the top 100 for ten weeks. In 2003, the album was ranked at No. 379 in Rolling Stones 500 Greatest Albums of All Time and in 2013 the same magazine named Greetings from Asbury Park, N.J. as one of the "100 Greatest Debut Albums of All-Time". On November 22, 2009, Greetings from Asbury Park, N.J. was played in its entirety for the first time by Bruce Springsteen and the E Street Band, at the HSBC Arena in Buffalo, New York, to celebrate the last show of the Working on a Dream tour.

Recording
Springsteen and his first manager Mike Appel recorded the album at the low-priced, out-of-the-way 914 Sound Studios to save as much as possible of the Columbia Records advance, and cut most of the songs during the last week of June 1972.

There was a dispute not long after the record was recorded—Appel and John Hammond preferred the solo tracks, while Springsteen preferred the band songs. As such, a compromise was reached—the album was to feature five songs with the band ("For You", "Growin' Up", "Does This Bus Stop at 82nd Street?", "It's Hard to be a Saint in the City", and "Lost in the Flood") and five solo songs ("Mary Queen of Arkansas", "The Angel", "Jazz Musician", "Arabian Nights" and "Visitation at Fort Horn").

However, when Columbia Records president Clive Davis heard the album submitted on August 10, 1972, he felt that it lacked a potential hit single, and rejected it. Springsteen quickly wrote "Blinded by the Light" and "Spirit in the Night", and recorded both on September 11, 1972. Because pianist David Sancious and bassist Garry Tallent were unavailable, a three-man band was used—Vini Lopez on drums, Springsteen on guitar, bass and piano, and the previously missing Clarence Clemons on saxophone. Columbia accepted the revised album, and Davis was personally pleased with Springsteen's response.

Critical reception

Reviewing for Rolling Stone in July 1973, Lester Bangs hailed Springsteen as a daring new artist who sets himself apart from his contemporaries with songwriting that either has a serious meaning or showcases his uninhibited gift for verbose, overloaded lyrics and rhyme schemes. "Some of [his words] can mean something socially or otherwise", Bangs said, "but there's plenty of 'em that don't even pretend to, reveling in the joy of utter crass showoff talent run amuck and totally out of control". Peter Knobler wrote in Crawdaddy that "he sings with a freshness and urgency I haven't heard since I was rocked by 'Like a Rolling Stone' ... the album rocks, then glides, then rocks again. There is the combined sensibility of the chaser and the chaste, the street punk and the bookworm." Creem magazine's Robert Christgau said Springsteen's songs are dominated by the kind of mannered emotional transparency and "absurdist energy" that made Bob Dylan "a genius instead of a talent". In Christgau's Record Guide (1981), he wrote that despite the grandiloquent, unaccompanied "Mary Queen of Arkansas" and "The Angel", songs such as "Blinded by the Light" and "Growin' Up" foreshadow Springsteen's "unguarded teen-underclass poetry", while even the maundering "Lost in the Flood" is interesting.

In All Music Guide to Rock (2002), William Ruhlmann gave Greetings from Asbury Park, N.J. five stars and said that it combined the mid-1960s folk rock music of Bob Dylan, accessible melodies, and elaborate arrangements and lyrics: "Asbury Park painted a portrait of teenagers cocksure of themselves, yet bowled over by their discovery of the world. It was saved from pretentiousness (if not preciousness) by its sense of humor and by the careful eye for detail ... that kept even the most high-flown language rooted." In 2003, the album was ranked number 379 on Rolling Stone's list of the 500 greatest albums of all time. They ranked it 37th on their list of greatest debut albums.

Track listing

Personnel
Bruce Springsteen – lead vocals, acoustic guitar, electric guitar, harmonica, bass guitar, piano, keyboards, handclaps
Additional musicians
Clarence Clemons – saxophone, backing vocals, handclaps
Vini Lopez – drums, backing vocals, handclaps
David Sancious – piano, Hammond organ, keyboards
Garry Tallent – bass guitar
Richard Davis – double bass on "The Angel"
Harold Wheeler – piano on "Blinded by the Light" and "Spirit in the Night"
Louis Lahav – engineer
Jack Ashkinazy – remixing
John Berg – cover design
Fred Lombardi – back cover design
According to the unauthorized biography Bruce by Peter Ames Carlin, Steven Van Zandt provided sound effects on "Lost in the Flood", however, Van Zandt denied having any involvement on his official Twitter page.

Charts

The album first charted in the UK on 15 June 1985, in the wake of the Born in the USA tour arriving in Britain, and remained in the Top 100 for ten weeks.

Certifications and sales

See also

1973 in music
Asbury Park, New Jersey
Greetings from Cairo, Illinois – a 2005 album from Stace England about Cairo, Illinois with a cover mimicking Greetings from Asbury Park, N.J.
Greetings from... Jake – a 2019 album from Jake Owen with a cover mimicking Greetings from Asbury Park, N.J.

References

External links
 Album lyrics and audio samples

 Greetings from Asbury Park, N.J. at Myspace (streamed copy where licensed)
 The Asbury Park Boardwalk, New Jersey – Past and Present

Bruce Springsteen albums
1973 debut albums
Albums produced by Mike Appel
Columbia Records albums
Asbury Park, New Jersey